My Secret is the second studio album by Chinese singer G.E.M., released on October 29, 2010 by Hummingbird Music.

Track listing

References 

2010 albums
G.E.M. albums
Mandopop albums
Cantopop albums